Johann Aegidius Bach (9 February 1645 – November 1716) was a German organist, violist, and municipal orchestra director of Erfurt. He was Johann Sebastian Bach's 1st cousin once removed, Johannes Bach's son, and the father of composer Johann Bernhard Bach.

See also
Bach family

External links
List of members of the Bach family

1645 births
1716 deaths
German male classical composers
German classical composers
German Baroque composers
German classical organists
German male organists
German classical violists
Musicians from Erfurt
Johann Aegidius
18th-century keyboardists
18th-century classical composers
18th-century German composers
18th-century German male musicians
Male classical organists